Baptiste Lecaplain (born 23 May 1985 in Mortain) is a French comedian and actor. He does stand-up comedy and has appeared in some films.

Early life
In 2004, he got his baccalauréat. After that, he was a youth leader at Levallois-Perret but he quit that job in 2006 in order to become a comedian.

Career
In 2008, he started touring with his show Baptiste se tape l'affiche, which is mostly autobiographical. From January to February 2013, he did a break in order to tour with Jérémy Ferrari and Arnaud Tsamere for La Tournée du Trio in all French Zéniths. After that he continued touring for his own show which ended in 2014.

In 2012, he was part of Fidèles au poste !, as well as the movie .

In 2013, he was amongst the celebrities who appeared in a TV Special of French TV Serie Scènes de ménages.

In 2014, he played the main role of French movie , alongside Charlotte Le Bon and Félix Moati. He starred in a short film by Rémi Bezançon for the French road traffic safety. In October, he joined Les Grosses Têtes.

In 2015, he started a new tour with a show called Origines.

Filmography

Films

Television

References

External links

1985 births
French humorists
French stand-up comedians
21st-century French male actors
People from Manche
Living people